Gunabhiram Barua (1837-1894) was a nineteenth century Indian intellectual from Assam who ushered in new ideas of social reform in the early years of colonial rule in Assam. He was deeply influenced by the progressive intellectual currents of the Bengal Renaissance. He was among the few  Assamese publicists who had formally entered the Brahmo Samaj. All his life he propagated its liberal ideas through his writings.

Biography
Barua completed his college education from Presidency College, Calcutta and became an assistant commissioner under the colonial government. He remained in the job for the next 30 years.

After his first wife's death, his 1879 marriage with a Brahman widow, Bishnupriya Devi, created a sensation in the orthodox society of Assam. Bishnupriya and their daughter Swarnalata Barua were encouraged by him to write and publish their work in magazines and newspapers.

Barua advocated the cause of women's education and  took the bold step of sending his daughter Swarnalata Devi to a boarding school in Calcutta when he was working in the small town of Nagaon in Assam as an Extra Assistant Commissioner.

His son Jnanadabhiram Barua went on to become a well-known lawyer and leader of the Indian National Congress. Gunabhiram  wrote a number of tracts for children, published under the heading Lara Bandhu (Friend of Boys) in Arunodoi, the first Assamese newspaper, published by American missionaries. Lara Bondhu was also named as the first children's magazine in  Assamese literature edited by his son Karunabhiram Barua.

Gunabhiram Barua was a cousin of Anandaram Dhekial Phukan. In fact, Gunabhiram grew up under Anandaram's tutelage, as his parents died when he was a child.

Literary works
The first social drama in Assamese - Ramnabami-Natak - was written by Gunabhiram in 1857 and published as a book in 1870. The play tells the tragic story of a young widow, Nabami, and her lover, Ram, both of whom were compelled to commit suicide because of social disapproval of their relationship.

Gunabhiram is also remembered as a historian and biographer. In 1887 he published an Assam Buranji, which went on to become a school textbook.  He also wrote regularly on issues such as women's education and marriage reforms. Kathin Shobdor Rohasyha Bakhya is a humorous work by Barua, published posthumously in 1912. .

Gunabhiram Barua published and edited the short-lived but hugely influential literary journal Assam-Bandhu(1885-1886). Famous conservative intellectuals such as Ratneshwar Mahanta and Rudraram Doloi also contributed to its pages.

Trivia
Hindi film actor Sharmila Tagore is the granddaughter of Gunabhiram's son Jnanadabhiram on her maternal side.

See also
 History of Assamese literature
 List of Asam Sahitya Sabha presidents
 List of Assamese-language poets
 List of Assamese writers with their pen names

References

1837 births
1894 deaths
Dramatists and playwrights from Assam
People from Kamrup Metropolitan district
19th-century Indian dramatists and playwrights
Indian male writers
Presidency University, Kolkata alumni
19th-century Indian male writers
19th-century Indian essayists
19th-century Indian historians
Scholars from Assam